The Regio 2N is family of a double-deck, dual-voltage electric multiple unit trainsets built for French rail operator SNCF to serve its regional rail routes (TER, Transilien, and RER).

The trains utilize a unique and highly configurable design. One of the end cars is single-deck and designed to accommodate wheelchair users, the other end car is double-deck. The intermediate cars are either double-deck with no doors accommodating seated passengers traveling long distances or single-deck with two double doors per side accommodating standing passengers traveling short distances. Trains can be configured with six, seven, eight or ten cars. Additionally, the seating can be configured for intercity service (2+1 seating in 1st class, 2+2 seating in 2nd class), regional service (2+2 seating throughout), or high-capacity commuter service (3+2 seating throughout).

The train was designed and originally built by Bombardier, but during delivery the company was bought by Alstom, which completed the order. A total of 447 trainsets have either been built or are under construction at the Alstom Crespin factory since 2012. The first set was placed into regular passenger service in September 2013.

The name Regio 2N is a sensational spelling of the word "region" (in reference to the regional rail routes these trains serve) including SNCF's designation for double-deck rolling stock: 2N (French: 2 Niveaux, English: two-level). Bombardier brands this equipment as the OMNEO and SNCF classes it as Z 55500, Z 56300, Z 56500, Z 56600 or Z 57000 depending on the configuration.

History 
The trains were designed by Bombardier in response to a request issued by SNCF, which had sought to equip itself with a new generation of regional EMUs. Between 2002 and 2009, SNCF had experienced a 40% increase in passengers on its TER regional services, averaging around 800,000 passengers per day, and further growth in demand had been forecast over the following decades; the procurement of new trainsets was financed primarily by various regional authorities rather than SNCF itself. Following the receipt of several bids, during November 2009, an SNCF spokesperson stated that Bombardier was the preferred bidder at that stage. On February 24, 2010, Bombardier announced that it had been awarded a firm order for 80 trainsets.

In February 2012, static testing of an early trainset commenced; by September of that year, testing had proceeded to the trial running phase, which was conducted at the Velim railway test circuit. Between September 2012 and September 2013, the test fleet of nine pre-series trainsets accumulated 100,000 km of single-unit operations and 20,000 km of multiple-unit operations. In September 2013, a ceremony was held at the Crespin manufacturing plant, where Bombardier build the Omneo, at which the first trainset was delivered to SNCF; it was attended by company president Guillaume Pepy and various representatives of the regions that had funded the order—by that time expanded to 129 trainsets—ahead of delivery and testing across SNCF's own network. At the time, Bombardier stated that the test programme was 90% completed, the remainder largely focusing upon electromagnetic compatibility, air conditioning, and general multiple-unit operations; production was also ramping up from one trainset per month to three per month by January 2014.

In January 2014, SNCF exercised its option to procure a further 30 trainsets; these were followed by eight more Omneos during October 2015. In February 2016, four additional trainsets were opted for, resulting in a total of 213 trainsets being on order at this point. In November 2016, SNCF ordered 40 trainsets in the Premium configuration, this batch being the first to be equipped as such, featuring improved onboard amenities and a higher top speed; by August 2018, dynamic testing of the first Omneo Premium trainset was underway. By February 2018, a total of 382 trainsets had been ordered. In November 2018, 19 Premium trainsets were ordered for service from Paris to Hauts-de-France points. The Omneo is set to replace various older trainsets, including the Z2N, V2N, Vo-VR2N, RRR-Rio and Corail trains for both regional and intercity services across the French Regions.

Design 
The Bombardier Omneo is a double-deck electric multiple units (EMU). It features a modular design approach, allowing the trainset to be readily adapted for suburban, regional and intercity traffic. According to Bombardier, it is the world's first double-deck EMU to be articulated. Each trainset comprises both single level and double level cars; propulsion equipment, such as the braking resistors and electrical transformers, are installed on the roofs of the single level cars; the double level cars are dedicated to passenger seating alone. Dependent upon both length and seating configuration, a trainset can have a maximum passenger capacity of up to 1,380 people, being able to seat 780 of these. Individual cars of a trainset can be exchanged to change the ratio of double-deck to single-deck cars as to better suit a particular service.

The interior configuration is reconfigurable, allowing it to be adapted to suit the trainset's intended use and customer specifications. It has been anticipated that a common intercity configuration would feature a 2+1 seating configuration, dedicated luggage spaces, increased toilet capacity, greater seat pitch, individual reading lights and electric sockets, and footrests for greater comfort. The double level cars lack doors, as well as several common conveniences such as toilets and spaces for bicycles and wheelchairs, these can only be found within the single level cars. For passenger safety, an onboard CCTV system is also installed through the cars. The gangways between cars are also double level as to maximise passenger's accessibility and movement; the cars are wider than those of most conventional trains. The Premium variant of the Omneo features various improvements in passenger amenities over the Base model, these include spacious reclining seats with individual armrests, wider doors and a more luxurious interior.

SNCF classifies the base version as Z 55500 and the Premium as Z 56500. The trainsets are composed of relatively lightweight materials, which minimises axle loads; the Omneo is claimed by Bombardier to be 95% recyclable. It was designed to minimise both noise and vibration levels. The Omneo incorporates Bombardier's ECO4 technologies, comprising the four cornerstones of energy, efficiency, economy and ecology; examples include a permanent-magnet synchronous motor (PMSM), a thermo-efficient climate control system, aero-efficient exterior shaping, and an energy management control system, which reportedly reduce both energy consumption and CO2 emissions. Due to its high level of French-sourced content, the Omneo has received a Guaranteed French Origin label, the first to be granted within the rail industry.

Distribution of Orders

Operators and routes

TER Auvergne-Rhône-Alpes 

 Mâcon-Ville – Villefranche-sur-Saône – Lyon-Perrache – Vienne – Valence-Ville
 Saint-Étienne-Châteaucreux – Lyon-Part-Dieu – Ambérieu-en-Bugey
 Firminy – Saint-Étienne-Châteaucreux – Givors-Ville – Lyon-Perrache
 Lyon-Perrache – Saint-André-le-Gaz

TER Bretagne 

 Rennes – Saint-Malo
 Rennes – Brest
 Rennes – Quimper
 Rennes – Redon
 Rennes – Vannes

TER Centre-Val de Loire 

 Paris-Montparnasse – Le Mans
 Le Croisic – Nantes – Angers – Tours – Orléans
 Paris-Austerlitz – Tours – Orléans (planned Omneo Premium)
 Paris-Austerlitz – Bourges (planned Omneo Premium)
 Paris-Bercy – Nevers (planned Omneo Premium)

TER Hauts-de-France 
 Paris-Nord – Creil – Compiègne
 Lille-Flandres – Valenciennes
 Lille-Flandres – Libercourt – Lens
 Lille-Flandres – Don – Sainghin – Béthune
 Lille-Flandres – Amiens
 Paris-Nord – Amiens (planned Omneo Premium)
 Paris-Nord – Saint-Quentin – Cambrai or Maubeuge (planned Omneo Premium)

TER Nouvelle-Aquitaine 

 Bordeaux-Saint-Jean – Arcachon
 Bordeaux-Saint-Jean – Agen
 Bordeaux-Saint-Jean – Libourne – Angoulême

TER Normandie 

 Paris-Saint-Lazare – Rouen – Le Havre
 Paris-Saint-Lazare – Caen – Cherbourg
 Paris-Saint-Lazare – Rouen-Rive-Droite
 Paris-Saint-Lazare – Serquigny

TER Occitanie 
 Toulouse-Matabiau – Agen
 Toulouse-Matabiau – Montauban-Ville-Bourbon
 Toulouse-Matabiau – Narbonne
 Toulouse-Matabiau – Tarbes
 Toulouse-Matabiau – Pau
 Toulouse-Matabiau – Ax-les-Thermes

TER Pays de la Loire 

Since June 9, 2018, the Regio2N trains have been carrying out Interloire relations between Le Croisic or Nantes and Orléans

TER Provence-Alpes-Côte d'Azur 
 Marseille-Saint-Charles – Toulon – Hyères
 Marseille-Saint-Charles – Cannes – Nice-Ville – Monaco-Monte-Carlo – Menton – Vintimille

Transilien (Ile-de-France)

Transilien Line N 
 Paris-Montparnasse – Rambouillet
 Paris-Montparnasse – Dreux
 Paris-Montparnasse – Mantes-la-Jolie

Transilien Line R 
 Melun – Montereau via Héricy
 Paris-Gare-de-Lyon – Montereau via Moret
 Paris-Gare-de-Lyon – Montargis

RER D 
 Melun – Creil via Yerres or Coudray-Montceaux
 Creil – Malesherbes

References 

Bombardier Transportation multiple units
SNCF multiple units
Electric multiple units of France
High-speed trains of France
Train-related introductions in 2013
25 kV AC multiple units
1500 V DC multiple units of France